The Cathedral of the Holy Wisdom of God or Saint Sophia Cathedral in Harbin is a former Russian Orthodox church located in the central district of Daoli, Harbin City, Heilongjiang, China.

History
St. Sophia Orthodox Cathedral was built in 1907 after the completion of the Trans-Siberian Railway in 1903, which connected Vladivostok to northeast China. The Russian No.4 Army Division arrived in this region just after Russia's loss to the Japanese in the Russo-Japanese War (1904–1905). St. Sophia Church was built and completed of timber in March, 1907 as part of a plan to reconsolidate the confidence of the army by building an imposing spiritual symbol.

In 1921, Harbin had a population of 300,000, including 100,000 Russians. The church was expanded and renovated from September 23, 1923, when a ceremony was held to celebrate the laying of the cornerstone, to its completion on November 25, 1932, after nine years. The present-day St. Sophia Church was hailed as a monumental work of art and the largest Orthodox church in the Far East.

According to Harbin municipal religious and Daoli district archives, Fotiy Huo Desheng was the ninth rector of St. Sophia Church of Harbin.

Description

The church is located on the corner of Toulong Street (Toulong jie) and Zhaolin Street. It stands at 53.3 meters (175 ft) tall, occupies an area of 721 square meters (0.18 acres), and is the perfect example of Russian Revival architecture. The main structure is laid out like a cross with the main hall topped with a huge green-tipped dome. Under the bright sun, the church and the square area it stands on look quite like Red Square in Moscow.

Closure
Following the establishment of the People's Republic of China (PRC) in mainland China in 1949 by the victorious Communists, who ended all Christian missionary work, treaties were signed between the Soviet and Chinese governments that provided for the turning over of Russian churches to Chinese control. The cathedral was thus closed from the period of the Great Leap Forward (1958–61) through the Cultural Revolution (1966–76).
Although the cathedral's sturdy structure withstood its intended destruction during the Cultural Revolution, its empty hull became a warehouse for a nearby state-run department store, its windows were bricked up and saplings grew from the roof. Prefabricated concrete high-rises boxed the church in on all four sides, coming within yards of its walls, making the cathedral inaccessible and invisible from the street. For decades it remained the invisible center of the city, surrounded by decorative material stalls, an auto body shop, a pen factory, and apartments for city government employees, until the Beijing government designated the cathedral a national cultural heritage site in 1996 as part of a nationwide campaign to protect historical sites.

Restoration of the Cathedral (Old Harbin Nostalgia)
Following its designation in 1996 as a national cultural heritage site (First class Preserved Building), a newspaper article about the "hidden" cathedral prompted donations from locals to restore the church. Local corporations, individual businesses as well as workers from nearby department stores donated money to restore the cathedral and renovate the square. A total of 12,000,000 yuan (approximately $1.5 million US) was eventually gathered and the cathedral regained its visibility in 1997, as the surrounding buildings were torn down.

A new "Harbin Architecture Square" conspicuously highlighted the cathedral with a huge new fountain at its entrance. The European-looking space was assigned a new meaning as the embodiment of culture and art and was re-presented to the public as the proud heritage of the city.

Museum
As of 1997 the cathedral was turned into the Municipal Architecture and Art Museum (Harbin Architectural Art Gallery), showcasing the multi-cultural architectural developments of Harbin throughout the ages. At the official ceremony on September 2, 1997 to celebrate the restoration of Hagia Sophia Cathedral, Mayor Wang Guangdao underlined the cultural and economic benefits expected from the project:

"The restoration of Hagia Sophia Cathedral inspired the people of Harbin, raised the level of our culture, let the whole of China and foreign friends know China, and opened a way for faster economic development."

The restoration was the culmination of the Harbin municipal government's attempt to turn the city's colonial era structures into tourist attractions by restoring and granting them landmark status. The restored structures are said to signify civilization (wenming) and culture (wenhua).

Gallery

See also

 Russian Revival architecture
 Chinese Orthodox Church
 Christianity in China
 Harbin Russians
 Russians in China
 Russian Orthodox Church
Churches in Harbin
 Church of the Intercession in Harbin (Orthodox)
 Harbin Nangang Christian Church (Protestant)
 Sacred Heart Cathedral of Harbin (Roman Catholic)

References

Sources and further reading
 David Wolff. To the Harbin Station: The Liberal Alternative in Russian Manchuria, 1898-1914. Stanford University Press, 1999.
 Yukiko Koga. "The Atmosphere of a Foreign Country": Harbin's Architectural Inheritance. In: Anne M. Cronin, Kevin Hetherington. Consuming the Entrepreneurial City: Image, Memory, Spectacle. Routledge, 2008.
 Saint-Sophia Church. Government of Harbin website.
 "PRESERVED BUILDINGS." Harbin Urban and Rural Planning Bureau.
 "St. Sophia Church." China Spring Tour.

External links
 St Sophia Church of Harbin at Orthodox.cn.
 Saint Sophia Cathedral in Harbin (The Baidu Photo Gallery) (in Chinese)
 Timeline of Orthodoxy in China at OrthodoxWiki.

Chinese Orthodox Church
Eastern Orthodox church buildings in China
Churches in Harbin
Cathedrals in China
Former churches in China
Art museums and galleries in China
Harbin Heritage Sites
Churches completed in 1932
20th-century Eastern Orthodox church buildings
Museums in Heilongjiang
Russian diaspora in China
Major National Historical and Cultural Sites in Heilongjiang
20th-century churches in China